James Henry Deakin (1851 – 8 November 1881) was a British Conservative politician, the son of Col. James Henry Deakin, a Manchester merchant.

In 1874 he was elected Member of Parliament for Launceston at a by-election, after his father's election had been nullified due to the use of corrupt practices. He resigned in 1877.

References
Hansard Project: Controversial Elections

External links 

 

1851 births
1881 deaths
Members of the Middle Temple
Members of the Parliament of the United Kingdom for Launceston
UK MPs 1874–1880
Conservative Party (UK) MPs for English constituencies